Ti' punch literally meaning "small punch", is a rum-based mixed drink that is especially popular in Martinique, Guadeloupe, Haiti, French Guiana, Réunion, and other French-speaking Caribbean islands. It is also the national cocktail of Martinique and Guadeloupe. It is very similar to the daiquiri, which is usually identified with Cuba, and the caipirinha, identified with Brazil.  A major difference with the daiquiri is that the Ti' punch contains little lime juice; the lime element is mostly zest.

The drink is traditionally made with white rhum agricole, lime, and cane syrup.  While aged 
rhum agricole can be used in place of white rhum agricole, other fruit flavors may be added on top of the lime, and sugar may be substituted for cane syrup, a Ti' punch can only be made with rhum agricole.

Service 
Ti' punch is usually served as an apéritif. Ti' punch predates the wide availability of ice in the Caribbean, and both the traditional neat and contemporary iced preparation are prevalent today.

See also 

 Caipirinha – similar Brazilian drink
 Daiquiri – similar Cuban drink

References 

  Ti' Punch by Brett Moskowitz at Liquor.com
 Feasting on Waves
 Caribbean Spirits Recipes
 Ti' Punch at Esquire
 Ti' Punch at Punchdrink.com

Cocktails with rum
Mixed drinks
Cold drinks
Caribbean drinks
French alcoholic drinks
Haitian alcoholic drinks